Ghiath Matar was a Syrian activist who became known for giving flowers and roses to army soldiers in his home town of Daraya.

Death
Ghiath was arrested on 6 September 2011 by the security forces of the Syrian government. Four days later, his body was returned to his family with clear scars and sores resulting from severe torture. His funeral was attended by the ambassadors of the United States, Japan, Germany, France and Denmark. When Ghiath died, his wife was expecting their first baby. The baby was named after his father.

Ghiath Matar became a symbol of peaceful resistance of the Syrian revolution.

A documentary on Matar, by the  filmmaker Sam Kadi, Little Gandhi, was a winner at the Independent European Film Festival in April 2016, winning  the Ahmed Khedr Award for Excellence in Arab Filmmaking.

References

Year of birth missing
2011 deaths
Syrian activists
Syrian torture victims